The Detroit Mechanix are an American professional ultimate frisbee team based in Madison Heights, Michigan. The Mechanix compete in the American Ultimate Disc League (AUDL) as a member team of the league's Central Division. The Mechanix began play in 2012 as one of the eight charter teams of the American Ultimate Disc League (AUDL). The team is owned by Brent Steepe and was founded in 2010.

The Mechanix have not won a game since April 29, 2017. Their all-time regular season record is 16–110 and the team has gone winless in consecutive seasons twice in 2014–15 and 2018–19, winning only one game in 2017. They have finished last in points per game in six of their nine seasons and last in the Midwest division in eight of their nine seasons.

The Mechanix currently play their home games at Grand Rapids Christian High School in Grand Rapids, Michigan. Until 2015, The Mechanix played home games at Bishop Foley Catholic High School in Madison Heights. The Pontiac Silverdome was home to the team in 2012, and in 2013 and 2014 the Mechanix played at Ultimate Soccer Arenas.

On February 29, 2020, three players died in a multi-car crash en route to a Mechanix practice.

Players and staff

2022 roster

International players

Player records
To the 2021 season.

Games played

Points played

Goals scored

Assists

Blocks

References

External links
 

Ultimate (sport) teams
Sports teams in Detroit
2012 establishments in Michigan
Ultimate teams established in 2012